State Route 138 (SR 138) is a  state highway in West Tennessee, connecting the town of Toone with Interstate 40 (I-40).

Route description

SR 138 begins in Hardeman County at an intersection with SR 18. It goes northwest through wooded areas to enter Toone, where it passes through town along Main Street before having an intersection with SR 100. The highway then leaves Toone and continues northwest through mostly wooded areas to cross into Madison County. SR 138 continues north through farmland to have an intersection with SR 223 before passing Mercer. It continues north through farmland and rural areas for several miles to an intersection with US 70/SR 1 before coming to an end at an interchange with I-40 (Exit 68), where the road continues north as Providence Road. The entire route of SR 138 is a rural two-lane highway.

Major intersections

References

138
Transportation in Hardeman County, Tennessee
Transportation in Madison County, Tennessee